Euskal Herritarrok (EH) was a Basque independentist and socialist political party in the Basque Country. EH was banned in 2003 by the Supreme Court of Spain on the grounds that it sympathized with ETA.

History
In February 2000, Batzarre and Zutik left EH after the rupture of the ETA 1998-2000 truce, due to the absence of any condemnation of that fact by EH. In June 2000 a sector of Herri Batasuna also decided to split and form the Aralar Party, that openly and fully rejected ETA and its rupture of the truce.

Election results

References

 
Banned secessionist parties
Banned socialist parties
Basque conflict
Basque history
Defunct socialist parties in the Basque Country (autonomous community)
Political parties established in 1998
Politics of Spain
Pro-independence parties
Secessionist organizations in Europe
Banned political parties in the Basque Country (autonomous community)
Organisations based in San Sebastián